Busso is a comune (municipality) in the Province of Campobasso in the Italian region Molise, located about  west of Campobasso.

Busso borders the following municipalities: Baranello, Campobasso, Casalciprano, Castropignano, Oratino, Spinete, Vinchiaturo.

References

External links
 Official website 

Cities and towns in Molise